HMS E7 was a British E class submarine built at Chatham Dockyard. She was laid down on 30 March 1912 and was commissioned on 16 March 1914. She cost £105,700.

Design

The early 'Group 1' E class boats were armed with four 18 inch (450 mm) torpedo tubes, one in the bow, one either side amidships, and one in the stern; a total of eight torpedoes were carried. Group 1 boats were not fitted with a deck gun during construction, but those involved in the Dardanelles campaign had guns mounted forward of the conning tower while at Malta Dockyard.

E-Class submarines had wireless systems with  power ratings; in some submarines, these were later upgraded to  systems by removing a midship torpedo tube. Their maximum design depth was  although in service some reached depths of below .

Crew
Her complement was three officers and 28 men.

Service history
When war was declared with Germany on 5 August 1914, E7 was based at Harwich, in the 8th Submarine Flotilla of the Home Fleets.

She and the other submarines returned from the patrol on 18 August 1914. Then on 30 June 1915, E7 began a 24-day patrol in the Sea of Marmara. She succeeded in sinking 13 ships and damaging many more.

The German Submarine UB-14 was in port of Chanak to await repairs. While there on 4 September, word came that E7 was entangled in Ottoman antisubmarine nets off Nagara Point, which the Ottoman battleship  had laid.

The U-boat′s commander, Oberleutnant zur See Heino von Heimburg, and UB-14s cook, a man by the name of Herzig, set out in a rowboat to observe the Ottoman attempts to destroy E7. After several mines that formed part of the net had been detonated to no avail, von Heimburg and his group rowed out and repeatedly dropped a plumb line until it contacted metal. Then, von Heimburg dropped an Ottoman sinker mine with a shortened fuse right on top of E7. After the hand-dropped mine detonated too close for the British submarine's captain's comfort, he ordered his boat surfaced, abandoned, and scuttled. Between shellfire from the Ottoman shore batteries and E7′s scuttling charges, von Heimburg and company narrowly escaped harm. While most sources credit E7′s sinking to the Ottoman efforts, author Robert Stern contends that von Heimburg and UB-14 deserve partial credit for the demise of E7.

References 

 
 .

External links
 'Submarine losses 1904 to present day' - Royal Navy Submarine Museum 

 

British E-class submarines of the Royal Navy
Ships built in Chatham
1913 ships
World War I submarines of the United Kingdom
Royal Navy ship names
World War I shipwrecks in the Dardanelles
Maritime incidents in 1915